The Reverend Sir Frederick Larkins Currie, 2nd Baronet (18 April 1823 in Gorakhpur, Uttar Pradesh – 13 November 1900) was an English baronet, the eldest child of Sir Frederick Currie, 1st Baronet and Susannah née Larkins.

He was educated at Rugby and Christ's College, Cambridge, where he played first-class cricket for the university. He became an Anglican clergyman, holding incumbencies at Exton and St Andrew's Wells Street, W.1

Family
He married Eliza Reeve Rackham on 18 September 1849. They had seven children: Eliza Kate, Susannah Louisa, Frederick Reeve, Walter Louis Rackham, Percy George Colin, Arthur Edward and Cecil Edmund, who played cricket for Cambridge University and Hampshire.
After his first wife's death, he married Mary Helen Corrie on 24 April 1866. There were no children by the second marriage.

On his death the title passed to his son, Frederick Reeve Currie. and, after Frederick Reeve's death, to his next son Walter Louis Rackham Currie.

References

1823 births
People from Gorakhpur
People educated at Rugby School
Alumni of Christ's College, Cambridge
1900 deaths
Cambridge University cricketers
19th-century English Anglican priests
Baronets in the Baronetage of the United Kingdom
English cricketers
Marylebone Cricket Club cricketers